The Vancouver Nats were a major junior ice hockey team based in Vancouver, British Columbia that played two seasons in the Western Canada Hockey League from 1971 to 1973. The team relocated in 1973 to Kamloops to become the Kamloops Chiefs before settling in Seattle as the Seattle Breakers (later Thunderbirds) in 1977.

On the ice, the Nats finished last overall in the league both years, winning just 27 games in their two years.  After their demise, it would be nearly thirty years before the WHL would return to the city of Vancouver, with the Vancouver Giants established as an expansion team in 2001.

Season-by-season record
Note: GP = Games played, W = Wins, L = Losses, T = Ties Pts = Points, GF = Goals for, GA = Goals against

NHL alumni
 Jim Atamanenko
Bruce Greig
Dale Lewis
Brian Ogilvie
Barry Smith

See also
List of ice hockey teams in British Columbia

References
2005–06 WHL Guide
hockeydb.com

Defunct ice hockey teams in British Columbia
Nats
Ice hockey clubs established in 1971
Defunct Western Hockey League teams
1971 establishments in British Columbia
1973 disestablishments in British Columbia
Ice hockey clubs disestablished in 1973